Cactus Club Cafe is a Canadian-owned chain of premium casual restaurants that originated in North Vancouver, British Columbia. The chain has since expanded to 31 locations throughout Canada, with other locations throughout British Columbia, Alberta, Saskatchewan, and Ontario.

History
Cactus Club Cafe was founded in 1988 by two former Earls waiters, Richard Jaffray and Scott Morison. The partners started with a restaurant named "Café Cucamongas", which they sold in 1988 to fund the establishment of the Cactus Club. In 1996, the company expanded into Alberta during a financially challenging time period. The organization continued to thrive and by 1998 the company expanded to 10 locations in British Columbia and Alberta. In 2005, Richard Jaffray bought out Scott Morison's interest in the business; Morison has gone on to establish Browns Socialhouse, a similar chain of Canadian premium casual restaurants.

According to a 2019 legal judgement filed in the Supreme Court of British Columbia: "Mr. Jaffray owns 50% of the voting shares and other shares equal to a 35% interest. Earl’s Holdings Ltd. also owns 50% of the voting share and other shares equal to a 45% interest. Stanley, the Fuller Family Trust, Rockefuller and Cacthold own the balance of the other shares equal to a 20% interest but no voting shares."

By 2008, Cactus Club Cafe had 19 locations in British Columbia and Alberta. That year, the company took on Rob Feenie (the first Canadian to win Iron Chef America) as its executive chef and "food concept architect". Dishes created by Feenie are indicated on the restaurant's menus with "RF". By the time of their 25th year in business, the company had about 2,500 employees and 27 locations.

In 2013, Matthew Stowe, a product development chef with Cactus Club Cafe, was named the winner of Top Chef Canada's third season.

In February 2022, The Fuller Family acquired full control of Cactus Club Cafe from Richard Jaffray.

See also
 List of Canadian restaurant chains
 Joey (restaurant)
 Earls (restaurant chain)

References

External links

 

Restaurant chains in Canada
Restaurants in British Columbia
Food and drink companies based in Vancouver
Canadian companies established in 1988
Restaurants established in 1988
1988 establishments in British Columbia